Doto africana is a species of sea slug, a nudibranch, a marine gastropod mollusc in the family Dotidae''.

Distribution
This species was described from Chuaka, Mkoani, Pemba, Tanzania, Africa.

Description
The size of the body attains 15 mm.

References

Dotidae
Gastropods described in 1905